The 2010 Delray Beach International Tennis Championships was a tennis tournament played on outdoor hard courts. It was the 18th edition of the Delray Beach International Tennis Championships, and was part of the International Series of the 2010 ATP World Tour. It took place at the Delray Beach Tennis Center in Delray Beach, Florida, United States, from February 22 through February 28, 2010. Mardy Fish was the defending champion, but he lost 2–6, 3–6 to Ivo Karlović in the semifinals.

Ernests Gulbis won in the final 6–2, 6–3 against Ivo Karlović.

Seeds

Draw

Finals

Top half

Bottom half

Qualifying

Seeds

Qualifiers

Draw

First qualifier

Second qualifier

Third qualifier

Fourth qualifier

References

External links
 Main Draw
 Qualifying Draw
 Delray Beach Open 2010 - Singles Main Draw on ITF site

Delray Beach Open
Delray Beach International Tennis Championships - Singles
2010 Delray Beach International Tennis Championships